Vladimir Iorikh (born 1958, Novokuznetsk) is a Russian steel tycoon, president of the Swiss firm  Conares Holding  and founder of private equity and a venture capital firm, Pala Investments.

Career
Iorikh began his investment activity in the coal sector, but expanded his investments into other resource sectors with business partner, Igor Zyuzin. He made much of his initial fortune during the breakup of the Soviet Union.  He served as chief executive officer of Mechel until he sold his stake in the company in 2006.

References 

1958 births
Living people
People from Novokuznetsk